Kathryn Lande Selmer Brown (November 6, 1930 – November 20, 2022) was an American composer and singer who was best known for her compositions and performances for children, which include three operas, many songs, and appearances on television, including as co-host of the television show Birthday House. She performed and published her music under the name Kay Lande.

Biography
Lande was born in Westerleigh, Staten Island, New York. She studied music at the Eastman and the Juilliard Schools of Music. In 1953, she married Edward Selmer Jr. and they had a son and a daughter. After Selmer's death in 2000, she married William Brown.

Career
A member of the American Society of Composers, Authors, and Publishers (ASCAP), Lande was employed by CBS. She collaborated as a singer and composer with many musicians, including Edna Bettler, the Carillon Singers, Eric Carlson, Art Carney, Alan Cole, Wade Denning, Carol Joan Drexler, Jim Dukas, Kathy Dunn, Tom Glazer, the Golden Orchestra, Carolyn Jonathan, Danny Kaye, Gene Kelly, Andre Kostelanetz, Jack Lazare, Anne Lloyd, the Norman Luboff Choir, Gilbert Mack, Mitch Miller and his orchestra, Hunter Payne, Edgar Powell, Peggy Powers, Noel Regney and his orchestra, Harold Ronk, the Sandpipers Chorus and Orchestra (also known as the Golden Sandpipers), Bob Spiro, Frank Stanton, Gene Steck, Jim Timmens and the Golden Orchestra, and Paul Tripp.

Lande was recorded commercially by A. A. Records, Caprice, Children's Records of America, Columbia, Disneyland, Educational Reading Service, Golden Press, Golden Records, Harmony, Kaneil Music, Leo the Lion Records, RCA Camden, Simon Says, Wonder, and Wonderland Records. She appeared on the following television programs:
Arthur Murray Party (1952)
Birthday House (late 1950s – early 1960s)
Diver Dan and the Bermuda Onion (1961)
Captain Kangaroo (1962)
Romper Room (undated)

Compositions
Lande's music was published by Wellington Songs. Her compositions include:

Incidental music 

Birthday House
Captain Kangaroo

Operas 

The Princess and the Pea
The Princess Who Couldn't Laugh
The Shoemaker and the Elf

Songs 

Bubbly Time (with Wade Denning)
Father, I Thank Thee (with Edna Bettler)
For Sleepyheads Only
I Know a Game (with Wade Denning)
Kay Lande's ABC 123
Kitty Kat
Let's Go to the Toy Shop
Let's Have a Party
Let's Play School
Mommy, Come See
Mommy, Please Come Play with Me
My Little Ballerina
My Musical Monkey (with Frank Stanton)
Song for Little Folk
Tennis? Tennis?
Trip to Lullaby Land (with Edna Bettler)

References

External links 
 

American women composers
Television composers
American opera composers
20th-century American women singers
20th-century American singers
1930 births
2022 deaths
People from Staten Island
Eastman School of Music alumni
Juilliard School alumni
ASCAP